The Bodil Award for Best Actress in a Supporting Role is one of the merit categories presented by the Danish Film Critics Association at the annual Bodil Awards. Created in 1948, it is one of the oldest film awards in Europe, and it honours the best performance by an actor in a supporting role in a Danish produced film. The jury can decide not to hand out the award, which happened numerous times between 1950 and 1985. Since 1986, it has been awarded every year.

Honorees

1940s 
 1948: Ellen Gottschalch won for her role in 
 1949: Karin Nellemose won for her role in

1950s 
 1950: Not awarded
 1951: Not awarded
 1952: Sigrid Neiiendam won for her role in 
 1953: Not awarded
 1954: Not awarded
 1955: Not awarded
 1956: Not awarded
 1957: Not awarded
 1958: Not awarded
 1959: Not awarded

1960s 
 1960: Not awarded
 1961: Not awarded
 1962: Not awarded
 1963: Not awarded
 1964: Not awarded
 1965: Not awarded
 1966: Not awarded
 1967: Not awarded
 1968: Not awarded
 1969:  won for her role in

1970s 
 1970: Not awarded
 1971: Not awarded
 1972: Not awarded
 1973:  won for her role in Oh, to Be on the Bandwagon!
 1974: Not awarded
 1975: Not awarded
 1976:  won for her role as Sylvie in A Happy Divorce
 1977: Bodil Kjer won for her role as Sabine Lund in Strømer
 1978: Not awarded
 1979: Grethe Holmer won for her role as Kirsten's mother in In My Life

1980s 
 1980: Berthe Qvistgaard won for her role in Johnny Larsen
 1981: Helle Fastrup won for her role in 
 1982: Ghita Nørby won for her role in 
 1983: Not awarded
 1984: Birgitte Raaberg won for her role in In the Middle of the Night
 1985: Not awarded
 1986: Catherine Poul Jupont for her role in The Dark Side of the Moon
 1987: Sofie Gråbøl won for her role in The Wolf at the Door
 1988:  won for her role in Pelle the Conqueror
 1989:  won for her role in Katinka

1990s 
 1990: Kirsten Rolffes won for her role in Waltzing Regitze
 1991:  won for her role in 
 1992: Ditte Gråbøl won for her role in 
 1993: Birthe Neumann won for her role in Pain of Love
 1994: Pernille Højmark won for her role in Black Harvest
 1995:  won for her role in Nightwatch
 1996: Anneke von der Lippe won for her role as Eva in Pan
 1997: Katrin Cartlidge won for her role in Breaking the Waves
 1998: Birgitte Raaberg won for her role as Judith Petersen in Riget II
 1999: Anne Louise Hassing won for her role in The Idiots

2000s 
 2000: Paprika Steen won for her role as Stella in The One and Only
 2001: Lene Tiemroth won for her role as Karen's mother in Italian for Beginners
  was nominated for her role as Liv in The Bench
  was nominated for her role as Connie in The Bench
 2002:  won for her role as Heidi in One-Hand Clapping
 Birthe Neumann was nominated for her role as Elly in Chop Chop
 2003: Paprika Steen won for her role as Maria in Open Hearts
 Julia Davis was nominated for her role as Moira in Wilbur Wants to Kill Himself
  was nominated for her role in Minor Mishaps
 Birthe Neumann was nominated for her role as Hanne in Open Hearts
 2004: Ditte Gråbøl won for her role in Move Me
 Bronagh Gallagher was nominated for her role as Sophie in Skagerrak
 Lisa Werlinder was nominated for her role as Maria in The Inheritance
 2005: Trine Dyrholm won for her role in In Your Hands
  was nominated for her role as Lone Kjeldsen in King's Game
  was nominated for her role in Aftermath
 Sonja Richter was nominated for her role in In Your Hands
  was nominated for her role in 
 2006: Charlotte Fich won for her role as Lisbeth in Manslaughter
  was nominated for her role in Murk
 Tuva Novotny was nominated for her role in Bang Bang Orangutang
 Pernille Valentin Brandt was nominated for her role as Gunnar in Nordkraft
 2007: Stine Fischer Christensen won for her role in After the Wedding
 Mette Riber Christoffersen was nominated for her role in Life Hits
 Bodil Jørgensen was nominated for her role in 
 Sofie Stougaard was nominated for her role in Lotto
 Mia Lyhne was nominated for her role in The Boss of It All
 2008: Charlotte Fich won for her role as Mette in Just Another Love Story
  was nominated for her role in 
 Stine Fischer Christensen was nominated for her role in Echo
 Trine Dyrholm was nominated for her role as Eva in Daisy Diamond
  was nominated for her role as Mother in The Art of Crying
 2009:  won for her role as Karen in Worlds Apart
  was nominated for her role as Selma in Fear Me Not'
 Ghita Nørby was nominated for her role as Sigrid in What No One Knows Paprika Steen was nominated for her role in Fear Me Not 2010s 
 2010:  won for her role as Scarlett in Deliver Us from Evil  was nominated for her role in Love and Rage Charlotte Fich was nominated for her role in Love and Rage Solbjørg Højfeldt was nominated for her role in  Lea Høyer was nominated for her role in  2011: Patricia Schumann won for her role as Sofie in Submarino  was nominated for her role as Helena in Everything Will Be Fine Laura Skaarup Jensen was nominated for her role as Karen in The Experiment Rosalinde Mynster was nominated for her role as Julie in Truth About Men Paprika Steen was nominated for her role as Siri in Everything Will Be Fine 2012: Paprika Steen won for her role as Anna in SuperClásico  was nominated for her role as Susan in Rebounce Charlotte Gainsbourg was nominated for her role as Claire in Melancholia Anne Louise Hassing was nominated for her role as Sanne in A Family Charlotte Rampling was nominated for her role as Gaby in Melancholia 2013: Frederikke Dahl Hansen won for her role as Maria in You & Me Forever Emilie Kruse was nominated for her role as Christine in You & Me Forever Elsebeth Stentoft was nominated for her role as Ingrid in Teddy Bear  was nominated for her role in  Trine Dyrholm was nominated for her role as Juliana Maria of Brunswick-Wolfenbüttel in A Royal Affair 2014: Susse Wold won for her role as Grethe in The Hunt Anne Louise Hassing was nominated for her role as Agnes in The Hunt Kristin Scott Thomas was nominated for her role as Crystal in Only God Forgives Sonja Richter was nominated for her role as Merete Lynggaard in The Keeper of Lost Causes Uma Thurman was nominated for her role as Mrs H in Nymphomaniac 2015:  won for her role in Klumpfisken 2016: Trine Pallesen won for her role as Katrine in Key House Mirror 2017:  won for her role in In the Blood 2018: Julie Christiansen won for her role in  :  won for her role in A Fortunate Man 2020s 
 :  won for her role in Daniel : Sidse Babett Knudsen won for her role in ''

See also 

 Robert Award for Best Actress in a Supporting Role

References

Sources

Further reading

External links 
  

1948 establishments in Denmark
Awards established in 1948
Actress in a supporting role
Film awards for supporting actress